Drongos may refer to:
The Drongos, a quartet of New Zealanders who performed in New York City
Drongo, a family of small passerine birds of the Old World tropics